Kirchheimbolanden is an administrative unit (Verbandsgemeinde) in the German state of Rhineland-Palatinate.

Municipalities
The Verbandsgemeinde ("collective municipality") Kirchheimbolanden consists of 16 Ortsgemeinden ("local municipalities").

Bennhausen
Bischheim
Bolanden
Dannenfels
Gauersheim
Ilbesheim
Jakobsweiler
Kirchheimbolanden — the capital of the district
Kriegsfeld
Marnheim
Mörsfeld
Morschheim
Oberwiesen
Orbis
Rittersheim
Stetten

References

External links
www.kirchheimbolanden.de — official website
www.ngw.nl — coat of arms

Verbandsgemeinde in Rhineland-Palatinate
North Palatinate